Polsat 1 is a Polish television channel belonging to Telewizja Polsat launched on December 18, 2015, replacing Polsat 2 abroad. It is intended for recipients of Polish origin, staying abroad. 
On April 6, 2020 Polsat 1 changed its logo and graphic design along with neighboring Polsat channels. Polsat 1 didn't change logo, the number 1 was only modified.

Programming
The channel offers Polsat series, including:
Na krawędzi,
Pielęgniarki,
Przyjaciółki,
Świat według Kiepskich, 
To nie koniec świata,
Trudne sprawy;

hobby programs, like
Ewa gotuje
Taaaka ryba

entertainment programs, such as
Kabaret na żywo
Nasz nowy dom

and programs directed to Polish people living in the United States like Oblicza Ameryki.

External links
 

Polsat
Television channels in Poland
Television channels and stations established in 2015
2015 establishments in Poland
Polish-language television stations
Mass media in Warsaw
International broadcasters